United Surgical Partners International (USPI) is an American ambulatory care company based in Dallas, Texas. It was founded by Don Steen in 1998.

USPI currently is active in 28 states. USPI currently operates over 400 ambulatory facilities serving 9,000 physicians and 3.4 million patients annually. The company had partnerships with over 4,000 physicians and over 50 health systems in the United States, with over 19,000 employees. The company went public in 2001 and was taken private again in 2007.

In April 2015, USPI and Tenet Healthcare entered into an agreement to create the nation's largest ambulatory surgery platform. The transaction was finalized in June 2015.

History
United Surgical Partners International was founded in 1998 by Don Steen along with the primary stockholder Welsh, Carson, Anderson & Stowe.

The first USPI outpatient surgery facility was Dexeus Hospital in Barcelona, Spain. It was acquired in April 1998. The first US facilities were acquired with an acquisition in July 1998. They were in Tennessee, Missouri, and Alabama.

The first hospital joint venture followed shortly in June 1999 with Baylor Health Care System.

Business Strategy
The company has developed a three-way-joint-venture model which involves the connection of hospital partner + physician + management company.

USPI enters a targeted market by acquiring or developing surgical facilities in partnership with local physicians and, wherever possible, with a local hospital or health system. USPI approaches potential hospital partners to joint venture their outpatient surgical operations with those of USPI or to jointly develop a network of ASCs throughout the health system's service area. Many hospitals want to offer outpatient surgery in a freestanding center in order to more effectively compete in retaining or attracting surgeons and managed care contracting to their facilities. The USPI/hospital joint venture enables the parties to leverage USPI's management strengths to improve the surgical operations both in service and economic results.

References

External links
 

Companies based in Dallas
Health care companies based in Texas
Health care companies established in 1998
American companies established in 1998
Tenet Healthcare
2015 mergers and acquisitions